The 2015 Korean Tour was the fifth season of the Korean Tour to carry Official World Golf Ranking points. The season consists of 12 events, three of which were co-sanctioned by the OneAsia Tour. All the tournament had prize funds of at least 300 million won (approximately US$290,000). Four had prize funds of 1 billion won ($960,000) or more.

Schedule
The following table lists official events during the 2015 season.

Order of Merit
The Order of Merit was based on prize money won during the season, calculated using a points-based system.

Notes

References

External links
English-language version of official Korea PGA site 

2015 Korean Tour
2015 in golf
2015 in South Korean sport